Zhejiang Chinese Medical University (ZJMU) is a comprehensive public university based in Hangzhou city, capital of Zhejiang province, China.

History 
Zhejiang Chinese Medical University (ZCMU) was established 1953 originally as the Zhejiang Vocational School of Traditional Chinese Medicine. It later developed into Zhejiang College of Traditional Chinese Medicine in 1959. It has been accredited to offer master's degrees since 1978 and doctoral degrees since 1998. Since 1987, it also was granted permission to recruit students from Hong Kong, Macau, and Taiwan. In 2003 saw the creation of Post-doctoral Research Station and in February 2006, with the approval of Chinese Ministry of Education, the school was renamed as Zhejiang Chinese Medical University (ZCMU).

Administration

College Programmes
The university is organized into the following colleges.

TCM
Acu-Moxa and Tuina
Chinese Herbology
Clinical Medicine
Rehabilitation Therapeutics
Nursing

References

External links
Zhejiang Chinese Medical University Official website

Universities and colleges in Zhejiang
Educational institutions established in 1953
1953 establishments in China